The Church of Saidet et Tallé, sometimes spelled Saydet El Talle and translated as  Our Lady of the Hill, is a Maronite church in Deir el Qamar in Lebanon. It is one of the most important historical and religious sites in Deir el Qamar and dates to the 16th century.

Monk Nicolas Smisaati built a church on the site over the ruins of an old Phoenician temple dedicated to the goddess Astarte. It was destroyed by an earthquake in 859 and reconstructed by the Order of the Templars during the Crusades.

The second church was destroyed by the Saracens and rebuilt  during Fakhreddine 1st Maan's (1518-1544) reign. In 1673, Sheikh Abu Fares Karam of Ehden (Emir Ahmed Maan’s secretary) and his brother Sheikh Abu Nader enlarged the church and added a vault. During the reign of Bechir II Chehab (1789-1840) it was again enlarged and renovated.

Legend and legacy
According to the Maronite Heritage web site, "the legend says that there was a Druze Emir in Baakline looking at the hill of Dar El Kamar. He saw a light coming out of the hill so he gathered his soldiers and ordered them to go in the morning and dig in the land. 
He said to them: 'If you find an Islamic symbol, build a mosque. If you find a Christian symbol, build a church."

In the morning, the soldiers went and found a rock with a cross on it and under the cross there was the moon and venus. That was the sign that in the distant past there was a temple dedicated to the moon and venus and later it became a church.

Earthquakes and wars might be the reason for the holy site's disappearance. The rock discovered by the soldiers can be found above the old gate of the church. A Byzantine column can be found inside the church. The inhabitants honor a "miraculous" icon of our Lady of the Hill placed behind the altar. It was painted in 1867 by the Italian artist Guerra. On the feast of Our Lady of the Hill- the first Sunday of August - thousands of believers go in a big procession with the miraculous icon from the entrance of Deir El Qamar to the Church.

See also
Architecture of Lebanon

References

16th-century churches
Religious buildings and structures in Lebanon
Maronite church buildings in Lebanon
Chouf District
Phoenician temples
Astarte
Knights Templar